The following is a list of pilots and other aircrew who flew during the Battle of Britain, and were awarded the Battle of Britain Clasp to the 1939–45 Star by flying at least one authorised operational sortie with an eligible unit of the Royal Air Force or Fleet Air Arm during the period from 0001 hours on 10 July to 2359 hours 31 October 1940.

History
In 1942, the Air Ministry made the decision to compile a list from records of the names of pilots who had lost their lives as a result of the fighting during the Battle of Britain for the purpose of building a national memorial. This became the Battle of Britain Chapel at Westminster Abbey, which was unveiled by King George VI on 10 July 1947. The Roll of Honour within the Chapel contains the names of 1,497 pilots and aircrew killed or mortally wounded during the Battle.

Nothing was done officially, however, to define the qualifications for the classification of a Battle of Britain airman until 9 November 1960. AMO N850, published by the Air Ministry, stated for the first time the requirements for the awarding of the Battle of Britain Star, and listed the 71 units which were deemed to have been under the control of RAF Fighter Command.

In 1955 Flt Lt John Holloway, a serving RAF officer, began a personal challenge to compile a complete list of "The Few". After fourteen years of research Flt Lt Holloway had 2,946 names on the list. Of these airmen, 537 were killed during the Battle or later died of wounds received.

The Battle of Britain Memorial Trust, founded by Geoffrey Page, raised funds for the construction of the Battle of Britain Memorial at Capel-le-Ferne near Folkestone in Kent. The Memorial, unveiled by Queen Elizabeth The Queen Mother on 9 July 1993, shares the site with the Christopher Foxley-Norris Memorial Wall on which a complete list of "The Few" is engraved.

More recently, the Battle of Britain Monument on the Victoria Embankment in London was unveiled on 18 September 2005 by Their Royal Highnesses the Prince of Wales and the Duchess of Cornwall. The idea for the monument was conceived by the Battle of Britain Historical Society which then set about raising funds for its construction. The outside of the monument is lined with bronze plaques listing all the Allied airmen who took part in the Battle.

A
{|class="wikitable"
|-
!Name!!Rank!!Nationality!!Sqn during Battle!!Awards!!Notes
|-
|Adair, Hubert Hastings "Paddy||Sgt||British||213 &  151 Sqns|||| A pilot in a light bomber squadron during the Battle of France, transferred to Fighter Command. MIA 6 November 1940 presumed shot down.
|-
|Adams, Dennis Arthur||Plt Off||British||611 & 41 Sqn||||Retired May 1958 as a Squadron Leader; died 1995
|-
|Adams, Eric Henry||Sgt||British||236 Sqn||||
|- style="background:#2ee;"
|Adams, Hugh Charles||Plt Off||British||501 Sqn||||KIA 6 September 1940 (Pilot) Shot down in combat with a Bf 109 over Ashford in Hurricane P3089
|-
|Adams, Jack Sylvester||Flt Lt||British||29 Sqn||DFC||
|-
|Adams, Reginald Thomas||Flt Sgt||British||264 Sqn||||Joined 264 in September 1940. KIA 30 June 1942 over Germany as Air Gunner in No. 405 (Vancouver) Squadron RCAF
|-
|Addison, William Nathan||Sgt||British||23 Sqn||DFC DFM||
|- style="background:#2ee;"
|Aeberhardt, Raymond Andre Charles||Plt Off||British||19 Sqn||||KIA 31 August 1940 (Pilot) Spitfire R6912 overturned and burned landing at RAF Fowlmere following combat damage to flaps.
|-
|Agazarian, Noel le Chevalier||Plt Off||British||609 Sqn||||KIA 16 May 1941 (North Africa), ace with 7 victories
|-
|Aindow, Charles Robert||AC2||British||23 Sqn||||Died 3 February 2010
|-
|Ainge, Eric Douglas||Sgt||British||23 Sqn||||
|-
|Ainsworth, Sidney||Sgt||British||23 Sqn||||
|-
|Aitken, Arthur||Sgt||British||219 Sqn||||
|-
|Aitken, Henry Aloysius||Sgt||British||54 Sqn||||
|-
|Aitken, Sir John William Maxwell "Max", 2nd Baron Beaverbrook||Sqn Ldr||British||601 Sqn (CO)||DSO, DFC||Died 30 April 1985
|- style="background:#2ee;"
|Akroyd, Harold John||Plt Off||British||152 Sqn||||WIA 7 October 1940, Died 8 October 1940 Shot down in Spitfire N3039 during combat with fighters over Lyme Regis. Died the next day from burns received in the crash landing.
|-
|Albertini, Anthony Victor||Sgt||British||600 Sqn||||
|-
|Aldous, Eric Stanley||Plt Off||BR||600 Sqn||||KIA 16 October 1941:  Hit by AA over Flushing, NL, whilst serving with 615 Sqdn.
|-
|Aldridge, Frederick Joseph||Plt Off||British||610 &  41 Sqns||||Born Dublin, Ireland. Commended for Valuable Services in the Air 1945. Released from RAF 1947
|-
|Aldridge, Keith Russell||Plt Off||British||32 & 501 Sqns||||
|-
|Aldwinckle, Aylmer James Martinus||Plt Off||British||601 Sqn||||
|-
|Alexander, Edward Ariss||Sgt||British||236 Sqn||||MIA 25 February 1941
|-
|Alexander, John William Edward||Plt Off||British||151 Sqn||||
|-
|Allard, Geoffrey||Plt Off||British||85 Sqn||DFC, DFM*||KIFA 13 March 1941 (Pilot)
|-
|Allcock, Peter Owen Denys||Plt Off||British||229 Sqn||||Died WIA 17 December 1941 (Egypt)
|-
|Allen, Hubert Raymond "Dizzy"||Plt Off||British||66 Sqn||DFC||Died 1987
|-
|Allen, John William||Sgt||British||266 Sqn||||
|- style="background:#2ee;"
|Allen, John Henry Leslie||Fg Off||NZ||151 Sqn||||MIA 12 July 1940 Hurricane P3275 hit by return fire from a Dornier Do 17 while protecting convoy off Orfordness. Ditched in the sea.
|- style="background:#2ee;"
|Allen, John Lawrence||Fg Off||British||54 Sqn||DFC||KIA 24 July 1940 Spitfire R6812 crashed and burned at Cliftonville following damage to the engine in combat with Bf 109s over Margate.
|-
|Allen, Kenneth Mervyn||Flt Sgt||British||43, 257 & 253 Sqns||||
|-
|Allen, Leslie Henry||Sgt||British||141 Sqn||||
|- style="background:#2ee;"
|Allgood, Harold Henry||Sgt||British||85 & 253 Sqns||||KIFA 10 October 1940 (Pilot) Hurricane L1928 of 253 Sqn crashed into houses at Albion Place, Maidstone.
|-
|Allison, Jack Whitewell||Sgt||British||611 & 41 Sqns||||KIFA 15 October 1942. Commissioned August 1941; KIFA with 32 MU aged 26.
|-
|Allsop, Harold Gordon Leach||Sqn Ldr||British||66 Sqn||||
|- style="background:#2ee;"
|Allton, Leslie Charles||Sgt||British||92 Sqn||||KIFA 19 October 1940 (Pilot) Spitfire P3872 crashed at Tuesnoad Farm, Smarden.
|-
|Ambrose, Charles Francis||Plt Off||British||46 Sqn||DFC||
|- style="background:#2ee;"
|Ambrose, Richard||Plt Off||British||25 & 151 Sqns||||KIFA 4 September 1940 (Pilot) Hurricane V7405 crashed into a crane and burned out on takeoff from Stapleford on a ferry flight.
|-
|Ambrus, Jan K||Plt Off||Czechoslovak||312 Sqn|||| Died 2 January 1994
|-
|Anderson, Donald John||Plt Off||British||29 Sqn||||
|-
|Anderson, James Alexander||Sgt||British||253 Sqn||||
|-
|Anderson, John Denis||Sgt||British||152 Sqn||||
|-
|Anderson, Michael Frederic||Sqn Ldr||British||604 Sqn (CO)||DFC||
|- style="background:#2ee;"
|Andreae, Christopher John Drake||Fg Off||British||64 Sqn||||MIA 15 August 1940 Spitfire R6990 failed to return from a combat mission against Bf 109s over the channel, Andrae missing.
|- style="background:#2ee;"
|Andrew, Stanley||Sgt||British||46 Sqn||||KIA 11 September 1940 (Pilot) Hurricane P3325 crashed and burnt out during a patrol, cause not known.
|-
|Andrews, Maurice Raymond||Sgt||NZ||264 Sqn||||
|-
|Andrews, Sydney Ernest||Plt Off||British||32 & 257 Sqns||DFM||KIFA 9 August 1942 Egypt (Pilot)
|- style="background:#2ee;"
|Andruszkow, Tadeusz||Sgt||POL||303 Sqn||KW||KIA 27 September 1940 Hurricane V7289 shot down in combat by Uffz. Heinirch Kopperschrager over Horsham and crashed at Holywych Farm, Cowden.
|-
|Angus, James George Colin||Sgt||British||23 Sqn||||
|-
|Angus, Robert Alexander||Sgt||British||611 & 41 Sqns||||MIA 20 February 1941
|-
|Appleby, Michael John||Plt Off||British||609 Sqn||||
|- style="background:silver;"
|Appleford, Alexander N Robin L||Plt Off||British||66 Sqn||||
|-
|Arber, Ivor Kenneth||Sgt||British||603 Sqn||AFC||
|-
|Arbon, Paul Wade||Plt Off||British||85 Sqn||DFC||
|-
|Arbuthnott, John
||Sgt||British||1 & 229 Sqns||||KIA 4 February 1941 (Pilot)
|-
|Archer, Harold Thorpe||Sgt||British||23 Sqn||||KIA 30 June 1941
|-
|Archer, Samuel||Sgt||British||236 Sqn||||
|-
|Aries, Ellis Walter||Plt Off||British||602 Sqn||||
|- style="background:silver;"
|Armitage, Dennis Lockhart "Tage"||Flt Lt||British||266 Sqn||DFC||Died 5 March 2004
|-
|Armitage, Joseph Fox||Sgt||British||242 Sqn||||MIA 17 June 1941
|-
|Armstrong, William||Plt Off||British||54 Sqn||||WIA 18 February 1943 North Africa
|-
|Arnfield, Stanley John||Sgt||British||610 Sqn||||
|-
|Arthur, Charles Ian Rose||Plt Off||Canadian||141 Sqn||DFC||
|- style="background:#2ee;"
|Arthur, Charles John||Plt Off||British||248 Sqn||||MIA 27 August 1940; Blenheim crashed into the sea during a reconnaissance mission along the south Norwegian coast, Arthur and Sgt E A Ringwood MIA; Sgt R C R Cox KIA.
|- style="background:#2ee;"
|Ash, Robert Clifford Vacy||Flt Lt||British||264 Sqn||||KIA 28 August 1940; Defiant L7021 crashed in flames at Faversham following combat with Bf 109s; Sqn Ldr Gavin, the pilot, bailed out slightly injured, Ash baled out but was killed.(Air Gunner)
|-
|Ashcroft, Albert Edward David||Sgt||British||141 Sqn||||KIA 6 October 1944
|-
|Ashfield, Glyn||Fg Off||British||FIU||AFC DFC||KIA 12 December 1942 (Pilot)
|- style="background:#2ee;"
|Ashton, Dennis Garth||Plt Off||British||266 Sqn||||KIA 12 August 1940 Shot down in flames in Spitfire P9333 following combat with aircraft off Portsmouth. Body later recovered and buried at sea.
|-
|Ashton, Dennis Kenneth||Sgt||British||266 Sqn||||KIA 26 November 1940 (Malta)
|-
|Ashworth, Jack||Sgt||British||29 Sqn||||
|-
|Aslett, Arthur Thomas Reynor||Sgt||British||235 Sqn||||
|-
|Aslin, Donald James||Sgt||British||257 & 32 Sqns||||
|-
|Assheton, William Radclyffe||Plt Off||British||222 Sqn||||
|- style="background:#2ee;"
|Atkins, Frederick Peter John||Sgt||British||141 Sqn||||KIA 19 July 1940; Defiant L7015 shot down over the Channel following combat with Bf 109s; Plt Off R Kidson MIA, Atkins KIA. (Air Gunner)
|- style="background:#2ee;"
|Atkinson, Allan Arthur||Plt Off||British||23 Sqn||||KIFA 30 October 1940; Blenheim L6721 crashed at South Bersted in bad weather during routine patrol. Sgt H T Perry, Plt Off H J Woodward KIFA. (Air Gunner)
|-
|Atkinson, George||Sgt||British||151 Sqn||DFM||KIFA 1 March 1945
|-
|Atkinson, Gordon Barry||Plt Off||British||248 Sqn||DFC||
|- style="background:#2ee;"
|Atkinson, Harold Derrick||Plt Off||British||213 Sqn||DFC||KIA 25 August 1940
(Pilot) Failed to return from combat over Warmwell in Hurricane P3200, thought to have crashed into the sea.
|-
|Atkinson, Matthew Richard||Flt Lt||British||43 Sqn||||KIA 26 June 1942
|- style="background:#2ee;"
|Atkinson, Ronald||Plt Off||British||266, 242 and 213 Sqns||||KIA 17 October 1940 (Pilot) Hurricane P3174 shot down in combat with Bf 109s and crashed at Egerton near Pluckley.
|- style="background:#2ee;"
|Austin, Albert Lawrence||LAC||British||604 Sqn||||WIA 25 August 1940; died 26 August 1940; Blenheim L6782 crashed near Witheridge, Exeter, cause unknown; Sgts J G B Fletcher and C Haig KIA. Austin died the following day from injuries.Ramsay 1989, pp.261, 382, 758.
|-
|Austin, Anthony Thomas||Sgt||British||29 Sqn||||
|-
|Austin, Frederick||Fg Off||British||46 Sqn|||| KIA 17 March 1941 (Pilot)
|-
|Austin, Sydney||Sgt||BR||219 Sqn||DFM|| MIA 31 October 1941
|- style="background:#2ee;"
|Ayers, David Hart||Sgt||BR||600 & 74 Sqns|||| KIA 23 September 1940. Abandoned Spitfire P7362 during a routine patrol near Southwold for a cause unknown. His body later recovered from sea.
|- style="background:#2ee;"
|Ayling, Charles Albert Henry||Sgt||British||43, 266 Sqns & 421 Flight||||(pilot) KIA 11 October 1940 when his Spitfire (P7303) crashed near Newchurch following combat over Hawkinge.
|}

B

C

Notes on table
Ranks given are those held during the Battle of Britain, although a higher rank may have been achieved after the Battle.
All individuals listed in bold and highlighted in silver are believed to be still alive.
Aircrew listed as KIA, MIA, WIA or KIFA during the Battle of Britain are highlighted in blue.
The awards listed include those made during the Battle of Britain and during the remainder of World War II, as well as any made post-war.
In order to limit the numbers of footnotes which would otherwise be required, the symbol ‡ under "Notes" indicates several entries in the text of Ramsay 1989, while the symbol †''' indicates that information on the circumstances under which an airman became a casualty during the Battle is included in the text of the book. Where more than one crew member of a multi place aircraft was involved this is included as a cross-reference under "Notes"
In addition to 2,353 British aircrew, the RAF Roll of Honour recognises 574 personnel from other countries; namely:
Australia, Barbados, Belgium, Canada, Czechoslovakia, France, Ireland, Jamaica, Newfoundland, New Zealand, Poland, Rhodesia, South Africa and the United States.

Abbreviations
(CO) after "Sqn" denotes Commanding Officer of that squadron, as per the RAF Fighter Command Order of Battle on 15 September 1940, unless otherwise indicated.
(FAA) after a rank denotes a member of the Fleet Air Arm rather than the RAF.
"KIA" – "killed in action"
"KIFA" – "killed in flying accident", i.e. not during combat
"MIA" – "missing in action".
"WIA" –  "wounded in action" leading to death which, in some cases, may have occurred months later.
"POW" – "prisoner of war".
For details of RAF rank abbreviations, see RAF Commissioned Officer Ranks and RAF Non-Commissioned Officer Ranks.
For details of FAA rank abbreviations, see FAA Commissioned Officer Ranks.

Nationalities

Awards

See also
Non-British personnel in the RAF during the Battle of Britain
List of World War II aces from the United Kingdom
List of World War II aces by country
List of World War II air aces
List of RAF aircrew in the Battle of Britain (D–F)
List of RAF aircrew in the Battle of Britain (G–K)
List of RAF aircrew in the Battle of Britain (L-N)
List of RAF aircrew in the Battle of Britain (O-R)
List of RAF aircrew in the Battle of Britain (S-U)
List of RAF aircrew in the Battle of Britain (V-Z)

Notes
Notes

Citations

Bibliography

Ramsay, Winston, ed. The Battle of Britain Then and Now Mk V. London: Battle of Britain Prints International Ltd, 1989. .
Ringlstetter, Herbert (2005). Helmut Wick, An Illustrated Biography of the Luftwaffe Ace And Commander of Jagdgeschwader 2 During The Battle of Britain''. Atglen, PA: Schiffer Publishing. .

Remembering the Battle of Britain
Robert Dixon, '607 Squadron: A Shade of Blue'. The History Press 2008. 
Robert Dixon, 'A Gathering of Eagles' PublishBritannica 2004, 
Robert Dixon, 'Men of the North: A few of the Few' Wolf's Nick Publishing 2011, 

United Kingdom in World War II-related lists